This is a list of the preserved important buildings in Havana, capital of Cuba.

Havana was called by the Spanish as the "Key to the New World", and due to the British invasion attempts the Spanish greatly fortified it. 

The colonial coat of arms represented the first three main castles of the city and a key.

The "Old Havana and its Fortification System" is a UNESCO World Heritage Site since 1982.

In the first half of 20th century was a main center of American tourists.

Colonial

Demolished Colonial

Colonial in the nearby towns

Post-colonial

See also
Old Havana

References

 
Havana

Architecture in Cuba
Cuba
Cuba